The 1952–53 Scottish Division A was won by Rangers on goal average over nearest rival Hibernian. Motherwell and Third Lanark finished 15th and 16th respectively and were relegated to the 1953–54 Scottish Division B.

Rangers won the title with a 1–1 draw on the last day of the season, away to Queen of the South. Rangers equalised with 17 minutes to go and thereby won the league on goal average from Hibernian, preventing the Edinburgh club from winning a third successive title.

League table

Results

References

Scottish Football Archive

1952–53 Scottish Football League
Scottish Division One seasons
Scot